Major General Kathryn George Frost (November 7, 1948 – August 18, 2006) was the commander of the United States Army and Air Force Exchange Service from August 2002 to April 2005. At the time of her retirement, she was the highest-ranking woman in the United States Army. She was also the wife of former United States Representative Martin Frost of Texas.

Early life and education
Frost held a Bachelor of Arts in Education from the University of South Carolina and a Master of Arts in Counseling from Wayne State University.

Military career
Frost's military career covered thirty-one years and included a four-year assignment as the Adjutant General of the United States Army, with concurrent assignment as the Commanding General, Physical Disability Agency, and Executive Director, Military Postal Service Agency, and as the Commander, Eastern Sector, United States Military Entrance Processing Command. She served on the staff of then-Chairman of the Joint Chiefs of Staff Colin Powell during the 1991 Gulf War and as a White House aide under the first Bush and Reagan administrations.

Following her retirement from the army, she was offered the position of executive director of the American Association of University Women, an offer she was forced to decline for health reasons. Frost died on August 18, 2006, from breast cancer.

Personal life
Shortly before assuming the post at AAFES, Frost was diagnosed with breast cancer. She publicly stated that her military training gave her an advantage in dealing with cancer.

References

External links
 Defend America
 Nation's Restaurant News
 Obituary in the Washington Post.

1948 births
2006 deaths
Adjutants general of the United States Army
Burials at Arlington National Cemetery
Deaths from breast cancer
People from Latta, South Carolina
Spouses of Texas politicians
Female generals of the United States Army
University of South Carolina alumni
Wayne State University alumni
Military aides to the President of the United States
20th-century American women
20th-century American people
21st-century American women